Andrew Douglas Aitken  (born 10 June 1968) is a South African former rugby union player.

Playing career
During 1993 he had the opportunity to further his studies at the University of Oxford and during his time there, he played in the annual varsity match against University of Cambridge. After also playing for Watsonian in Edinburgh he returned to Western Province in 1997, helping the team to win the 1997 Currie Cup.

Aitken made his test debut for the Springboks as a replacement, against  at Parc des Princes in Paris. His first start for the Springboks, was the following week against  at Twickenham. He played a further five Test matches for the Springboks and was on the winning side each time. He also played in two tour matches.

Test history

Accolades
Aitken was voted as one of the five SA Young Players of the Year for 1990, along with Jannie Claassens, Bernard Fourie, Ian MacDonald and Theo van Rensburg.

See also
List of South Africa national rugby union players – Springbok no. 658

References

1968 births
Living people
South African rugby union players
South Africa international rugby union players
Sharks (Currie Cup) players
Western Province (rugby union) players
Stormers players
Rugby union players from Durban